Cyprus competed at the Summer Olympic Games for the first time at the 1980 Summer Olympics in Moscow, USSR.

Results by event

Judo
Men's under 60 kg
 Spyros Spyrou
 First Round — Defeated Ashkhoussen Mamodaly Yusei Gachi (Madagascar)
 Second Round —Lost Jürg Röthlisberger (Switzerland)

Men's under 65 kg
 Constantinos Constantinou - Round 1

Men's under 71 kg
 Neophytos Aresti - Round 1

Men's under 86 kg
 Spyros Spyrou
 First Round — Estrella Milton (Ecuador) in 5:00
 Second Round —Lost Holliday Hohn Ippon (United Kingdom|Great Britain) in 2:28

Men's under 95 kg
 Panicos Evripidou - Round 1

Swimming
Men's 100 m Backstroke
 Laris Phylactou
 Heats — 1:08.92 (→ did not advance)

Men's 100 m Breaststroke
 Linos Petridis

Men's 100 m Butterfly
 Linos Petridis
 Heats — 1:06.61 (→ did not advance)

Men's 100 m Freestyle
 Laris Phylactou
 Heats — 57,41 (→ did not advance)

Women's 100 m Backstroke
 Annabel Drousiotou
 Heats — 1:15.85 (→ did not advance)

Women's 100 m Freestyle
 Olga Loizou
 Heats — 1:06.50 (→ did not advance)

Sailing
Men's Finn (single handed dinghy)
 Laris Phylactou- 147 points (21st place)

Men's Double-Handed Dinghy (470)
 Demetrios Demetriou, Panayiotis Nicolaou - 117 points (14th place)

External links
Cyprus in 1980 Olympics by Cyprus Olympic Committee

Nations at the 1980 Summer Olympics
1980
Summer Olympics